Matveyevskoye is a rural locality (a village) in Kubenskoye Rural Settlement, Vologodsky District, Vologda Oblast, Russia. The population was 10 as of 2002.

Geography 
The distance to Vologda is 35 km, to Kubenskoye is 5 km. Irkhino is the nearest rural locality.

References 

Rural localities in Vologodsky District